Elections to the Inverclyde District Council took place in May 1992, alongside elections to the councils of Scotland's various other districts

Aggregate results

References

Inverclyde
Inverclyde Council elections